Rohan Veal (born 17 January 1977) is a specialist in the International Moth Class dinghy. He was heavily involved in the class transition to the use of hydrofoils. In 2005 and 2007 following Moth World Championship success he was shortlisted by the International Sailing Federation for the ISAF World Sailor of the Year Awards.

External links
 

1977 births
Living people
Australian sailors